Koundian may refer to several places in Africa:

Guinea
Koundian, Guéckédougou
Koundian, Kankan
Koundian, Kissidougou
Koundian, Mandiana
Koundian, Siguiri

Mali
Koundian, Mali